Electrifying 80s is the second studio album by Australian singer Tim Campbell. The album is a covers album of classic hits by Stock Aitken Waterman. Upon release Campbell said “As a child of the '80s, I grew up to the sound of Stock Aitken and Waterman and they were a huge inspiration in creating these tracks.”

The album was released on Campbell's own record label Encore Records in July 2018 and it peaked at number 15 on the ARIA Charts. A remix album titled Electrifying 80s - The Remixes was also released the same year, containing remixes of "You Spin Me Round (Like a Record)", "Never Gonna Give You Up", "Venus" and "You Think You're a Man".
The Album was produced and mixed by Paul Cecchinelli.

Track listing

Charts

Release history

References

2018 albums
Covers albums